Milwaukie, Oregon was incorporated on February 4, 1903. Current mayor Lisa Batey took office January 1, 2023.

List
William Shindler (1903–1909)
Philip Streib (1909–1913)
E.T. Elmer (1913–1915)
Guy C. Pelton (1915–1917)
John Snyder (1917–1923)
Alfred E. Cowell (1923–1927)
J.J. Miller (1927–1935)
J.M. Mason (1935)
William Sanders (1935–1937)
Earl S. Burdick (1937–1940)
Fred O. Roberts (1940–1945)
Fred Sperr (1945–1952)
Leonard Mullan (1952–1959)
Earl Clay (1959–1963)
Joe Bernard, Jr. (1963–1965)
George Haley (1965)
Robert Richmond (1965–1968)
Frank Clore (1968–1969)
Donald Graf (1969–1975)
Bill Hupp (1975–1979)
Allen Manuel (1979–1980)
Joy Burgess (1980–1984)
Ron Kinsella (1984–1986)
Roger Hall (1986–1990)
Craig Lomnicki (1990–1998)
Donald Graf (1998)
Carolyn Tomei (1998–2001)
James Bernard (2001–2009)
Jeremy Ferguson (2009February 7, 2015)
Wilda Parks (February 17, 2015May 19, 2015)
Mark Gamba (May 19, 2015January 1, 2023)
Lisa Batey (January 1, 2023Present)

References

Milwaukie, Oregon